Tribe of Judah is Gary Cherone's post-Van Halen band featuring multiple of former members of Extreme (bassist Pat Badger and drummer Mike Mangini). An eponymous EP was released in 2001 and a full-length album was released in late 2002. Tribe of Judah is different from Cherone's other work as it features a more industrial/electronic sound. At least one song, "Left for Dead", was (supposedly) slated to be a track on a follow-up Van Halen album which would have featured Cherone.

Discography

Studio albums
Exit Elvis (2002)

Extended plays
East of Paradise (2001)

Members
Gary Cherone – vocals
Steve Ferlazzo – keyboards
Mike Mangini – drums
Pat Badger – bass, vocals
Leo Mellace – guitar

References

External links

 Interview with Gary Cherone by The Breakdown Room

Hard rock musical groups from Massachusetts
American industrial rock musical groups
Musical groups established in 2001
Musical groups from Boston